The All-Party Parliamentary Group for Choice at the End of Life is a cross-party group of members of the British Parliament and Peers that supports better end-of-life options, including assisted dying. They believe that, subject to legal safeguards, terminally-ill adult patients should have the option of an assisted death in their final stages of life.

In 2012, this APPG launched a draft a bill for assisted dying which was presented to the House of Lords by Lord Falconer in 2013. The proposed bill was debated in 2014 but ran out of time in the run up to the 2015 general election. A version of the bill tabled by Rob Marris was eventually voted on and defeated in the House of Commons in September 2015.

The APPG is currently chaired by Labour MP Karin Smyth.

It was formerly chaired by Independent MP Nick Boles, who stood down at the 2019 General Election. Boles had faced a potentially life-threatening illness before supporting the campaign. Prior to this, the APPG was chaired by Kit Malthouse MP who called the campaign "the great human rights campaign of our political generation".

The secretariat is provided by the non-profit assisted dying campaign group Dignity in Dying.

APPG Chair and Vice Chairs

See also

 Assisted suicide in the United Kingdom
 Euthanasia in the United Kingdom
 Right to die

References

External links 
 Official website
 Register of the All-Party Parliamentary Group for Choice at the End of Life

All-Party Parliamentary Groups
Assisted suicide
Euthanasia organizations